Hitonari Maruyama (born 21 April 1942) is a Japanese alpine skier. He competed in the men's downhill at the 1968 Winter Olympics.

References

1942 births
Living people
Japanese male alpine skiers
Olympic alpine skiers of Japan
Alpine skiers at the 1968 Winter Olympics
People from Nagano (city)
20th-century Japanese people